The 1882 Kentucky Derby was the 8th running of the Kentucky Derby. The race took place on May 16, 1882.

Full results

Payout

The winner received a purse of $4,560.
Second place received $200.

References

1882
Kentucky Derby
May 1882 sports events
Derby